Warwick is a habitational surname derived from the English town of the same name. It may refer to the following people:

 Carl Warwick (born 1937), American baseball outfielder
 Carl Warwick (musician) (1917–2003), American jazz trumpeter
 Cathy Warwick (born 1968), English chess player and writer
 Cathy Warwick (midwife), Scottish midwife, trade union leader, and abortion rights activist
 Charles F. Warwick (1852–1913), American author, lawyer, and politician
 Clint Warwick (1940–2004), English musician
 Derek Warwick (born 1954), British Formula One driver
 Diana Warwick, Baroness Warwick of Undercliffe (born 1945), British Labour politician and life peer
 Dionne Warwick (born 1940), American singer
 Dee Dee Warwick (1945–2008), American singer
 Ernest Warwick (1918–2009), British author and prisoner of war
 Ernest Warwick (boxer) (1904–?), British boxer
 Ethel Warwick (1882–1951), British stage actress
 James Warwick (actor) (born 1947), English actor
 Joan Warwick (1898–1973), English croquet and hockey player
 John Warwick (disambiguation) – multiple people
 Joseph Warwick Bigger (1891–1951), Irish politician and academic
 Keith Warwick (born 1975), Scottish actor and musician
 Kevin Warwick (born 1954), British scientist and cyberneticist
 Kim Warwick (born 1952), Australian tennis player
 Lonnie Warwick (born 1942), American football player
 Lyn Warwick (born 1946), Australian politician
 Mildred Warwick (1922–2006), Canadian baseball player
 Norman Warwick (1920–1994), British cinematographer
 Nurham O. Warwick (born 1940), American politician 
 Paul Warwick (disambiguation) – multiple people
 Richard Warwick (1945–1997), English actor
 Richard Turner-Warwick (1925–2020), British urologist
 Ricky Warwick (born 1966), the frontman for the Scottish band The Almighty
 Robert Warwick (1878–1964), American actor
 Septimus Warwick (1881–1953), British architect
 Virginia Warwick (born 1903), American actress

References

English-language surnames